Elections were held in Wellington County, Ontario on October 24, 2022 in conjunction with municipal elections across the province.

Wellington County Council
Wellington County Council consists of the seven mayors of the constituent municipalities plus nine councillors elected from county wards.

Council races by ward

Centre Wellington
Incumbent mayor and county warden Kelly Linton did not run for re-election. The following were the results for mayor of Centre Wellington.

Erin
Town councillor Rob Smith ran against geologist Michael Dehn.

Guelph/Eramosa
Incumbent mayor Chris White was re-elected by acclamation.

Mapleton
Incumbent mayor Gregg Davidson was re-elected by acclamation.

Minto
Deputy mayor Dave Turton was elected by acclamation.

Puslinch
Incumbent mayor James Seeley was re-elected by acclamation.

Wellington North
Incumbent mayor Andy Lennox was challenged by township councillor Dan Yake.

See also
2018 Wellington County municipal elections
2014 Wellington County municipal elections
2010 Wellington County municipal elections

References

Wellington
Wellington County, Ontario